Nadya Zhexembayeva is an author, educator and business owner. She has written four and contributed to six books about business, strategy, reinvention and sustainability. In 2009, Dr. Zhexembayeva co-authored the concept of "embedded sustainability", in 2015 introduced the term "Chief Reinvention Officer," and in 2015 introduced the concept of "Titanic Syndrome", which she developed into a book in 2018. Nadya is the author of The Reinvention Method, which as of 2021 consists of nine tools bridging the fields of strategy, foresight, design thinking, SCRUM/Agile, organization development, leadership and change management. She is also a member of the Academic Committee of CEDEP.

Early life and career 
Dr. Zhexembayeva grew up in Almaty, Kazakhstan (then part of the Soviet Union), at the time she claims the country was "going through immense deterioration". While still at high school, Zhexembayeva started her business career selling insurance and later worked as a trainer at Association of Young Leaders, then went on to earn a Freedom Support Act scholarship that allowed her to complete two Bachelor of Arts degrees in Management and then Psychology from Hartwick College, where she was named a Faculty Scholar and John Christopher Hartwick Scholar – "the highest honor the College can confer upon a student". In 2008, she obtained her Doctor of Philosophy degree from Case Western Reserve University, where she served as associate director of the Center for Business as an Agent of World Benefit at Weatherhead School of Management, where as of 2016, she continues to serve on the Board of Advisors.

Dr. Zhexembayeva served as the Coca-Cola Chaired Professor of Sustainable Development at IEDC-Bled School of Management, an executive education center based in the Slovene Alps, where, as of 2016, she continues to teach courses in leadership, strategy, change management, design thinking, and sustainability. In addition to IEDC, Zhexembayeva has taught in other business schools, including CEDEP (France) and IPADE Business School (Mexico).

As a speaker, she has shared her insights with audiences worldwide through keynotes, panel presentations, and workshops. She has delivered four TEDx talks in Austria, Slovenia, the US., and Romania.

In 2007, Zhexembayeva co-founded WE EXIST Reinvention Agency. Based on Zhexembayeva's work with the Coca-Cola Company, ENRC Plc, IBM, CISCO, Erste Bank, Henkel, Knauf Insulation, Vienna Insurance Group on reinventing products, processes, and leadership practices in Ventures magazine called Zhexembayeva ‘The Reinvention Guru’, while TEDx Navasink named her ‘The Queen of Reinvention.’

In 2014, Dr. Zhexembayeva co-founded Reinvention Academy, with the mission to provide 1 billion people with strong resilience and reinvention skills.

Books 
Dr. Nadya Zhexembayeva has written four books and contributed to six others that focus on strategy, innovation, reinvention and sustainability.

Author:
 The Chief Reinvention Officer Handbook: How to Thrive in Chaos (2020)
 Titanic Syndrome: Why Companies Fail and How To Reinvent Your Way Out of Any Business Disaster (2018)
 Overfished Ocean Strategy: Powering Up Innovation for a Resource-Deprived World (2014)
 Embedded Sustainability: The Next Big Competitive Advantage (2011)

Chapter contributor:
 The Business of Building a Better World: The Leadership Revolution That Is Changing Everything (2021)
 Sustainable Business: A One Planet Approach (2017)
 Practicing Organization Development: Leading Transformation and Change (2015)
 Globally Responsible Leadership: Managing According to the UN Global Compact (2013)
 Positive Design and Appreciative Construction: From Sustainable Development to Sustainable Value (2010)  (Full citation: Nadya Zhexembayeva (2010), A whole new value: Driving innovation, sustainability, and prosperity through appreciative inquiry, in Tojo Thatchenkery, David L. Cooperrider, Michel Avital (ed.) Positive Design and Appreciative Construction: From Sustainable Development to Sustainable Value (Advances in Appreciative Inquiry, Volume 3) Emerald Group Publishing Limited, pp. 77 – 96)
 Handbook of Transformative Cooperation: New Designs and Dynamics (2007)

Articles and reports

Interviews and podcasts

References

External links 
 
 
 

Living people
Case Western Reserve University alumni
Hartwick College alumni
American business writers
Women business writers
Year of birth missing (living people)